Charles Henry "Jim" Allen  (born 15 August 1951) is a former Montserratian first-class cricketer who was a part of the World Series Cricket West Indies XI and is considered the greatest ever Montserrat sportsperson.

Born in Harris Village, Montserrat, to Handsome and Alberta Allen, Jim Allen starred in Montserrat cricket from a young age, making his debut for the Montserrat cricket team in the 1969 Leeward Islands Tournament, and scored his first century for Montserrat against St Kitts cricket team at Sturge Park, Montserrat in 1971.

Allen made his first-class debut on 15 January 1972 for Leeward Islands against Windward Islands at Roseau, scoring one and 82. An attacking right-hand batsman with an unorthodox, open–chest, wide-legs batting stance, Allen was soon considered a more exciting batsman than his Leeward Islands teammate Vivian Richards.

Outside of cricket Allen worked as a bulldozer driver Allen became the first professional Montserratian sportsperson when he began playing in England during the northern summer, turning out for teams in the Lancashire and Cheshire cricket leagues. Allen's best season was 1976/77, where he scored 559 first-class runs at 50.81, with a highest score of 150.

World Series Cricket

Allen's good form led to a lucrative offer to join the World Series Cricket (WSC) competition when it commenced in Australia in late 1977. Recommended by West Indies captain Clive Lloyd, it took WSC owner Kerry Packer's representatives two months to find Allen, searching the West Indies and England before finding him.

The only member of the West Indian squad not to play Test cricket, Allen appeared in three SuperTests against the Australians but struggled, scoring a total of 44 runs with a high score of 20.

Back in the West Indies

Following the end of World Series Cricket, Allen returned to the West Indies for the 1978/79 season where he scored his highest first-class score of 161 against Jamaica. In 1978, Allen was awarded with an MBE (Member of the Order of the British Empire) for his services to cricket. Allen sustained an eye injury during a practice session in May 1981 and underwent surgery at Mount Sinai Hospital in New York. He was forced to wear contact lenses and returned during the 1981/82 season, although his runscoring ability fell from prior to the accident. He played three more years before retiring.

Allen made news in April 1982 when he failed to arrive in time for the final of the Geddes Grant/Harrison Line Trophy between Leeward Islands and Barbados, leaving Leeward Islands officials scrambling for a replacement.

Upon his retirement, Allen had scored 3,067 first-class runs at 34.07. He also took three wickets at 30.00 with his right arm medium pace and took 42 catches and a stumping. For Montserrat, Allen scored four centuries.

Post-retirement
Since his retirement, an annual lecture series, held on his birthday, has been established in Montserrat to honour Allen. Additionally, a number of Montserratian artists have written poems about Allen and there are calls to name a local street or erect a statue of Allen in front of the government headquarters in the de facto Montserrat capital Brades. Allen's importance to Montserrat was encapsulated by local writer Professor Howard Fergus, who said "He (Allen) had made all Montserratians see, feel and know that they, in spite of all, could scale any height of achievement accomplished by those overbrimming with opportunity."

Allen's brother George Allen and son Davon Williams have both also played first-class cricket for Leeward Islands.

References

Sources
 Fergus, H. (1996) Gallery Montserrat: Some Prominent People In Our History, Canoe Press, Montserrat. .

World Series Cricket players
1951 births
Living people
Leeward Islands cricketers
Montserratian cricketers
British people of Montserratian descent
West Indian cricketers of 1970–71 to 1999–2000